Erith station serves Erith in the London Borough of Bexley, southeast London.

The station stands between Belvedere and Slade Green on the North Kent line and is served by Greenwich line trains running from the station westbound generally to Cannon Street via London Bridge and eastbound to Dartford or to Central London via the Dartford loop and Sidcup.

The station buildings date from the opening of the line in 1849.

Services

The typical off-peak service in trains per hour is:
 4 tph to London Cannon Street (2 of these run via  and 2 run via )
 2 tph to 

During the peak hours, the station is served by an additional half-hourly circular service to and from London Cannon Street via  and Lewisham in the clockwise direction and via Greenwich in the anticlockwise direction.

Connections
London Buses routes 99, 180, 229 and 469 serve the station.

References

External links

Railway stations in the London Borough of Bexley
Former South Eastern Railway (UK) stations
Railway stations in Great Britain opened in 1849
Railway stations served by Southeastern
1849 establishments in England